The abbreviation DPD may stand for:

Computing
 Dead Peer Detection, an IPSec VPN feature
 Delegated Path Discovery, a public-key query method
 Densely packed decimal, a system of binary encoding for decimal digits

Engineering and technology
 Diffusion pressure deficit
 Digital Pre-Distortion, a subset of Multidimensional Digital Pre-distortion that deals with linearization of non-orthogonal, non-linear systems.
 Digital product definition, a near-synonym of model-based definition
 Dissipative particle dynamics, a mesoscopic particle-based materials simulation technique
 Diver propulsion device, an underwater vehicle

Law
 EU Dangerous Preparations Directive
 EU Data Protection Directive
 Development Plan Document, in town and country planning in England and Wales
 Digital Phonorecord Delivery, a U.S. Copyright Office process for sound recording registration

Mental disorders
 Dependent personality disorder, over-dependence on others 
 Depersonalization-derealization disorder, feeling detached from one's self
 Depressive personality disorder, disorder with depressive features

Organic chemicals
 Dihydropyrimidine dehydrogenase, an enzyme
 N,N-diethyl-p-phenylenediamine, a phenylenediamine often used to determine chlorine in water

Police in the United States
 Denver Police Department, Colorado
 Detroit Police Department, Michigan 
 Dallas Police Department, Texas

Politics
 Democratic Party of Germany (Demokratische Partei Deutschlands or "DPD"), liberal party in Germany
 Regional Representative Council, a chamber of the Indonesian parliament

Other uses
 DPDgroup, an international parcel-delivery business
 Diccionario panhispánico de dudas (Pan-Hispanic Dictionary of Doubts), Spanish lexicon
 Distributed participatory design
 Dorking Deepdene railway station, England (GBR code: DPD)